Alexander Ross (15 September 1879 – 25 June 1952) was a Scottish professional golfer. He was a native of Dornoch and learned his golf in his home country, but like many British professional golfers of his era he spent many years working as a club professional in the United States. While employed by the Brae Burn Country Club, near Boston, he won the 1907 U.S. Open at the St. Martin's course at Philadelphia Cricket Club. He competed in the U.S. Open seventeen times in total, and finished in the top-10 five times. His other tournament wins include the North and South Open six times (1902, 1904, 1907, 1908, 1910, 1915), the Massachusetts Open six times (1906, 1907, 1908, 1909, 1910, 1912) and the Swiss Open three times (1923, 1925, 1926).

Ross's older brother Donald also moved to the U.S. and was one of the most celebrated of all golf course designers. Alec was the professional at the Detroit Golf Club in Detroit, Michigan for 31 years. He died in Miami, Florida.

Professional wins
Note: This list may be incomplete.
1902 North and South Open
1904 North and South Open
1906 Massachusetts Open
1907 U.S. Open, North and South Open, Massachusetts Open
1908 North and South Open, Massachusetts Open
1909 Massachusetts Open
1910 North and South Open, Massachusetts Open
1912 Massachusetts Open
1915 North and South Open
1923 Swiss Open
1925 Swiss Open
1926 Swiss Open

Major championships

Wins (1)

Results timeline
Note: Ross played only in the U.S. Open.

NT = No tournament
DNP = Did not play
CUT = missed the half-way cut
"T" indicates a tie for a place
Green background for wins. Yellow background for top-10

See also
List of golfers with most wins in one PGA Tour event

References

Further reading

External links
Article on early Scottish golfers in the U.S. (including the Ross brothers)

Scottish male golfers
Winners of men's major golf championships
People from Sutherland
Sportspeople from Highland (council area)
1879 births
1952 deaths